Lewes Victoria Hospital is a health facility at Nevill Road in Lewes, East Sussex, England. It is managed by NHS Property Services with services operated principally by Sussex Community NHS Foundation Trust, Sussex Partnership NHS Foundation Trust, University Hospitals Sussex NHS Foundation Trust, East Sussex Healthcare NHS Trust, and with parts of community medical cover provided by general practitioners from Foundry Healthcare Lewes, the local primary care network.

History
The facility has its origins in the Lewes Dispensary which was established in the High Street in 1847. It moved to larger premises at School Hill where it opened as the Lewes Dispensary and Infirmary in 1855. It moved again to its current building, which was designed by Ernest Runtz and George Ford in the Queen Anne style, and which opened as the Victoria Hospital and Infirmary in 1909. It joined the National Health Service as the Victoria Hospital in 1948. In July 2018 the trust announced plans for an urgent treatment centre at the hospital.

References

External links
Official site

Hospital buildings completed in 1909
1847 establishments in England
Hospitals established in 1847
Hospitals in East Sussex
NHS hospitals in England
Lewes